Prehistoric Peeps was a cartoon series written and drawn by Edward Tennyson Reed starting in the 1890s. The cartoon appeared in Punch  magazine. A collection of the cartoons was published under the title Mr. Punch's Prehistoric Peeps in 1894. The cartoon series was adapted into a series of live-action silent films including Prehistoric Peeps (1905).

References

External links
 fotoLibria: Prehistoric Peeps
 The Lost Art of E.T. Reed--Prehistoric Peeps, edited by Joseph V. Procopio

Works originally published in Punch (magazine)
Comics set in prehistory
Prehistoric people in popular culture